The San Felipe Stakes is an American Thoroughbred horse race run annually at Santa Anita Park in Arcadia, California. It is a Grade II event open to three-year-old horses. Normally held in  early -March, it is raced at a distance of  one and one-sixteenth miles ( furlongs) on dirt and currently offers a purse of $400,000. It is listed as an official prep race on the Road to the Kentucky Derby.

Race history
Inaugurated as the San Felipe Handicap in 1935, due to World War II there was no race run in 1942, 1943, and 1944.  From 1935 through 1940  the race was open to colts and geldings, three years of age and older. Since 1941 it has been restricted to three-year-olds and in 1952 was made open to all three-year-olds irrespective of their sex. It was raced as a handicap event from 1935 through 1941 and again from 1952 through 1990.

As a prep for both the Santa Anita and Kentucky Derbies, the San Felipe has featured many of California's top three-year-olds over the years, including Derby winners California Chrome, Fusaichi Pegasus, Sunday Silence and Triple Crown winner Affirmed. 

The 2019 San Felipe was cancelled due to Santa Anita's safety-related suspension of live racing.

Since inception, it has been competed over a variety of distances:
 6 furlongs: 1938–1940, 1945–1946
 7 furlongs: 1937, 1941, 1947–1951
 1 mile: 1935–1936
  miles: since 1952

The San Felipe Stakes was run in two divisions in 1968 and 1970.

Race records
Speed  record:
 1:40.11 - Consolidator (2005) (at current distance of  miles)

Most wins by a jockey:
 7 - Chris McCarron (1982, 1983, 1986, 1988, 1991, 1993, 1998)

Most wins by a trainer:
 8 - Bob Baffert (1999, 2001, 2004, 2009, 2015, 2017, 2020, 2021)

Most wins by an owner:
 2 - Fred W. Hooper (1949, 1982)
 2 - Andrew J. Crevolin (1953, 1954)
 2 - William Haggin Perry (1965, 1968)
 2 - Burt Bacharach (1994, 1995)

Winners

* In 1983, Naevus was disqualified from first to second.

See also
Road to the Kentucky Derby

References

February 21, 1990 New York Times article on the creation of the Preview Stakes
The San Felipe Stakes at Pedigree Query

Horse races in California
Santa Anita Park
Flat horse races for three-year-olds
Triple Crown Prep Races
Graded stakes races in the United States
Recurring sporting events established in 1935
Grade 2 stakes races in the United States
1935 establishments in California